Strawberry Cream Soda Pop Daydream is the first compilation album from Tommy february6, released on February 25, 2009, by DefSTAR Records coinciding with Tommy heavenly6's release of Gothic Melting Ice Cream's Darkness Nightmare. The album was a released as a double-disc CD and DVD. The CD features all singles released by Tommy february6, one new song, and a few additional tracks. The DVD features music videos for each single, as well as making of videos.

Track listing

References

External links 
 Tommy february66 Official Site

2009 albums
Defstar Records albums
Tomoko Kawase albums